Henry Martin (born 1965-07-25 in San Juan) is an Argentine racing driver. He has run in different series, with major success in Turismo Carretera, TRV6 and TC 2000.

Career 
1979: Championship Sudamericano Júnior 
1981: Championship Sudamericano of Karting, Campeón Argentino de Karting Seniors 
1982: Championship Panamericano Señor (Chile) 
1985: Fórmula Renault Cuyana 
1986: Argentine Formula Renault 
1987: Argentine Formula Renault 
1988: Argentine Formula Renault 
1989: Argentine Formula Renault 
1990: TC2000 (Renault Fuego), Fórmula 2 Argentina, Formula Three Sudamericana (Reynard / VW) 
1991: Argentine Formula Renault
1992: Argentine Formula Renault, Turismo Carretera (coupé Dodge)
1993: TC2000 (Ford Sierra XR4), Turismo Carretera (Coupé Dodge), Supercart (Ford Falcon) 
1994: TC2000 (Renault Fuego), Supercart (Ford Falcon), Formula Three Sudamericana (Ralt / VW) 
1995: TC2000 (Ford Escort Ghía), Supercart (Ford Falcon)
1996: Formula Three Sudamericana (Dallara Fiat)
1997: TC2000 (Ford Escort Zetec), (Champion)
1998: TC2000 (Ford Escort Zetec) 
1999: TC2000 (Ford Escort Zetec) 
2000: TC2000 (Ford Escort Zetec), subcampeón
2001: Turismo Carretera (Ford Falcon), TRV6
2002: Turismo Carretera (Ford Falcon), TRV6
2003: Turismo Carretera, TRV6
2004: TRV6 - Turismo Carretera (Ford Falcon), 200 km of Buenos Aires TC2000 with Peugeot
2005: Turismo Carretera (Ford Falcon) - TRV6 
2006: TRV6, 200 km of Buenos Aires TC2000 (VW Bora)
2007: TC2000 (Honda Civic07) Honda Lubrax Team
2008: TRV6, Turismo Carretera

External links
Official site 

Argentine racing drivers
TC 2000 Championship drivers
Turismo Carretera drivers
Top Race V6 drivers
Living people
1965 births
Formula Renault Argentina drivers